Ifar "Eef" Barzelay (born May 12, 1970) is an Israeli-American musician. He is the principal songwriter and singer of alternative country band Clem Snide, but has also toured as a solo act, both as a headliner and in support of various artists such as Ben Folds.

Early life
Born in Tel Aviv, Israel on May 12, 1970, Barzelay grew up in Teaneck, New Jersey, and attended Teaneck High School.

Career

In 2006, Barzelay released his debut solo album entitled Bitter Honey. In 2007, he composed many original tracks for the film Rocket Science. Barzelay's second solo album, Lose Big, was released on June 17, 2008, on 429 records. In 2009, Barzelay reformed Clem Snide.

At the A.V. Fest 2011 in Chicago, Illinois, Barzelay performed the music of the popular rock band Journey.

In 2014 Barzelay recorded a version of Bee Gees's "How Can You Mend a Broken Heart" for a fundraising CD titled "More Super Hits Of The Seventies" for radio station WFMU. He also wrote and recorded five songs for the Rudderless soundtrack such as "Sam Spirals" and "A Day on the Water".

Discography
 Bitter Honey (CD) – spinART – February 21, 2006
 Rocket Science (Original Motion Picture Soundtrack) (CD) – Lakeshore Records – August 7, 2007
 Lose Big (CD) – 429 Records – June 17, 2008
 Black Tin Rocket: Songs of the Transmissionary Six EP (Digital download) – Bandcamp release – March 14, 2011
 Bitter Honey (Redux) (Digital Download) – Bandcamp release – March 31, 2011
 Clem Snide's Journey (Vinyl, Digital Download) – Bandcamp release – June 29, 2011
 Fan Chosen Covers (Best lets see if this works Of) (Digital download) – Bandcamp release – September 20, 2011
 Janie Jones - Original Motion Picture Soundtrack (CD, digital download) – Nettwerk – October 11, 2011
 Girls Come First (Digital Download) Bandcamp release – March 4, 2015

References

External links
 2007 Eef Barzelay Interview at Bandega.com 
 Eef Barzelay 15-05-2008 on Program tv Tesis of Canal 2 Andalusia
 Clem Snide's official site.[Currently unavailable]

1970 births
Living people
Israeli Jews
Israeli emigrants to the United States
Jewish American musicians
People from Teaneck, New Jersey
429 Records artists
Jewish rock musicians
Songwriters from New Jersey
21st-century American singers
SpinART Records artists
21st-century American Jews